Koma may refer to:

People 
 Koma clan, a Japanese clan descended from the royal family of Goguryeo
 Koma (rapper), French rapper of Algerian origin
 David Koma, Georgian fashion designer based in London
 Gaolese Kent Koma (1918-2006), Botswana politician, statesman, and businessman
 Jaroslav Koma (born 1985), Czech ice hockey player
 Matthew Koma (born 1987), American musician and singer-songwriter
 Koma Otake (born 1948), Japanese dancer

Places
 Koma, Egypt, a village in Egypt in late antiquity
 Koma, Iran
 Koma tou Gialou, Cyprus
 Koma Shrine, Shinto shrine in Saitama, Japan.

Languages 
 Koma language, a member of the Duru branch of Savanna languages of Cameroon
 Koma language (Bantu), a dialect of Simaa spoken in Zambia
 Koma language (Gur), also known as Konni, a language of Ghana

Transportation 
 Eppley Airfield in Omaha, Nebraska, United States
 Kōma Station (Iwate), in Morioka, Japan
 Koma Station (Saitama), in Hidaka, Saitama, Japan

Other uses 
 KOMA (FM), a radio station (92.5 FM) licensed to Oklahoma City, Oklahoma, United States
 KOKC (AM), a radio station (1520 AM) licensed to Oklahoma City, Oklahoma, United States, formerly known as KOMA
 Koma (film), a 2004 Hong Kong film
 Koma (cicada), a genus of cicadas
 Hyphaene, a genus of palms commonly called koma in Swahili
 Koma in Adamawa, a Nigerian ethnic group
 Koma Unwind, a beverage

See also
 Coma (disambiguation)
 KOMU